Lake Auquiscocha or Auquishcocha (both possibly from Wanka Quechua  to water, to irrigate; to give to drink, Quechua  prince; a mythical figure of the Andean culture, qucha lake) is a lake in the Cordillera Blanca in the Andes of Peru located in the Ancash Region, Carhuaz Province, Shilla District. Auquiscocha lies at the foot of Chequiaraju in the north and Hualcán in the southeast, southwest of Lake Chequiacocha.

References 

Lakes of Peru
Lakes of Ancash Region